Mario Chiesa (born 17 November 1966) is an Italian former professional racing cyclist. He rode in five editions of the Tour de France, six editions of the Giro d'Italia and four editions of the Vuelta a España. He currently works as a directeur sportif for UCI Continental team .

Major results
1987
 1st Stage 6 Giro della Valle d'Aosta
1990
 1st Trofeo Matteotti
1994
 3rd Giro del Friuli

Grand Tour general classification results timeline

References

External links
 

1966 births
Living people
Italian male cyclists
Cyclists from Brescia